Eidsberg Station is a railway station of the Eastern Østfold Line located in at Finnestad in Eidsberg, Norway. Situated  from Oslo Central Station (Oslo S), it is only served by extra rush-hour R22 service of the Oslo Commuter Rail. The station, which originally provided a passing loop, was designed by Balthazar Lange and opened on 24 November 1882. The passing loop was demolished in 1989 and the station unmanned. It was renovated as a heritage site in 2014.

History
Discussion of a railway through Eidsberg was first debated in the municipal council on 5 January 1867. The municipality approved a grant of 20,000 Norwegian speciedaler on 25 January 1873. After it was decided in 1873 that the Østfold Line was to be built, the main route controversy regarding the Eastern Line was whether it should run via Mysen, or take a straight line from Askim to Rakkestad. The railway engineers originally favored a bypass, but this was overruled by Parliament on 4 June 1874. Eidsberg was granted three stations. The southernmost was the most controversial and stirred up much local debate. The main proposed locations were Finnestad, Gjerud and Gutu. The municipal council ultimately voted on 1 May 1880 to let the decision fall on the railway company. The station and line opened on 24 November 1882, although temporary traffic had taken place since July. Many of the protests from the southern part of the municipality were met in 1895, when Heia Station opened.

Eidsberg Station grew up as a community hub and featured at various times a store, post office, telegraph, café, bakery and fuel station. However, there never grew up a village around station like many other of the stations in the area. The post office opened in 1885, and a year later a warehouse for Felleskjøpet was erected next to the station. A road was built from the station to Huseby in 1910. Eidsberg and Mysen were split into two municipalities in 1920. Unlike around Mysen Station, Eidsberg Station had never developed into a town. Some people called for the new municipal hall to be built next to the station so a new village could be built around them. This was not done and instead it was placed at Søndre Mysen. Despite efforts, only nine lots were sold around Eidsberg Station the following one and a half decade.

An interlocking system was installed at the station on 22 January 1971. The station became unmanned from 1 January 1989. The passing loop was disabled on 22 May. The station building was renovated by Rom Eiendom in 2014 for a cost of 2.5 million Norwegian kroner. In addition to bringing it up to modern standards, the work restored the window and door designs from 1882. This was part of a project to make the station a cultural heritage site. Eidsberg is the only station along either of the Østfold Lines which has received such a renovation.

Facilities
The station is located in a rural area and has 10 parking spaces for cars.

The station was designed by Balthazar Lange in Swiss chalet style, who had the responsibility for all stations along the Eastern Østfold Line. The wooden building is a third-class station and has the same design as many other stations on the line, Kråkstad, Tomter, Slitu, Mysen, Gautestad and Ise. The station building is listed as a cultural heritage site. The upper floor is rented out as a residence, while the ground floor is rented out as for commerce.

Service
Eidsberg is served with two daily R22 trains operated by Vy's Oslo Commuter Rail. The station had 3,400 daily boarding and disembarking passengers in 2012.

References

Bibliography

 
 
 
 
 

Railway stations in Eidsberg
Railway stations on the Østfold Line
Railway stations opened in 1882
1882 establishments in Norway